Hustleville, also known as Hustle, is an unincorporated community in Marshall County, Alabama, United States.

Hustleville has been noted for its unusual place name.

References

Unincorporated communities in Marshall County, Alabama
Unincorporated communities in Alabama